The 1936–37 Irish Cup was the 57th edition of the premier knock-out cup competition in Northern Irish football. 

Belfast Celtic won the tournament for the 3rd time, defeating the holders Linfield 3–0 in the final at The Oval.

Results

First round

|}

Quarter-finals

|}

Replay

|}

Second replay

|}

Semi-finals

|}

Replay

|}

Final

References

External links
 Northern Ireland Cup Finals. Rec.Sport.Soccer Statistics Foundation (RSSSF)

Irish Cup seasons
1936–37 domestic association football cups
1936–37 in Northern Ireland association football